"You Don't Own Me" is a popular song written by Philadelphia songwriters John Madara and David White and recorded by Lesley Gore in 1963, when Gore was 17 years old. The song was Gore's second most successful recording and her last top-ten single. On November 27, 2016,  along with 24 other songs, the Grammy Hall of Fame announced its induction.

The song was shocking in 1963 for its anti-patriarchal stance, showing the power of one woman to deny the wishes of a man. Since then, the song has been hailed as an early feminist anthem. In 2015, singer Grace took Gore's song to  1 in Australia with a version featuring rapper G-Eazy.

Background
The song expresses emancipation, as the singer tells a lover that he does not own her, that he isn't to tell her what to do or what to say, and that he is not to put her on display. The song's lyrics became an inspiration for younger women and are sometimes cited as a factor in the second wave feminist movement.

Gore said, "My take on the song was: I'm 17, what a wonderful thing, to stand up on a stage and shake your finger at people and sing you don't own me." In Gore's obituary, The New York Times referred to "You Don't Own Me" as "indelibly defiant".

Cash Box described it as "a throbbing, multi-track, ballad-with-a-beat on which [Gore] emotionally declares her independence."

Chart performance
The song reached number two on the Billboard Hot 100 in the United States. The song remained at number two for three consecutive weeks, beginning on February 1, 1964, unable to overcome the Beatles' hit "I Want to Hold Your Hand". It became Gore's second most successful hit after "It's My Party". The song was Gore's last top-ten single.

Weekly charts

Year-end charts

Later comparative criticism 
After the success of "You Don't Own Me", many of Lesley Gore's other songs, including "That's the Way Boys Are", were eventually compared to it and criticized for not coming up to feminist expectations. Of "That's the Way Boys Are", author Richard Aquila noted that the lyrics "voice the era's acceptance of sexual double standards," in contrast with the theme of Gore's previous single, "You Don't Own Me".  Aquila regards "That's the Way Boys Are" as one of several examples of Lesley Gore songs that regard women as dependents or passive objects, along with earlier singles "It's My Party" and "Judy's Turn to Cry."  Musicologist Walter Everett described "That's the Way Boys Are"  as one of the many 1960s sexist songs that "perpetuated a boys-will-be-boys tolerance for male but not female infidelity."  Music critic Greil Marcus also remarked on the way "That's the Way Boys Are" backs off from the "proto-feminist manifesto" of "You Don't Own Me" to a message of "he may treat you like garbage, but they're all like that, and we love 'em for it!"

On 14–21 August 1965, Patty Duke peaked at No. 8 on the Hot 100 with "Don't Just Stand There", which sounds very similar to "You Don't Own Me".

Grace version

The song was covered by Australian singer and songwriter Grace, and was released as her debut single. It features American rapper G-Eazy. Grace's version was produced by Quincy Jones, who also produced the original recording by Lesley Gore, and Parker Ighile. It was released on March 17, 2015, one month after Lesley Gore's death, and peaked at number one on the ARIA Charts, later being certified 3× Platinum by the ARIA. The song was also a success in New Zealand, peaking at number five for two consecutive weeks, and in the United Kingdom, peaking at number four.

In an interview with House of Fraser, Grace said, "[Quincy Jones] told me how the song came out during the feminist movement and how it was such a strong statement. I loved the song, started researching Lesley Gore and fell in love with her as an artist. [You Don't Own Me] really inspired me."

The song was released worldwide on August 17, 2015. It grew to prominence in the UK when it was used in the 2015 House of Fraser Christmas advert. It was also performed by The X Factor contestant Lauren Murray in 2015 and Matt Terry in 2016. The increased exposure for the song helped it rise to a peak of number four on the UK Singles Chart. The song was featured in the third trailer for the 2016 film Suicide Squad 
and appeared on the film's soundtrack album.

The song was featured in the opening of Riverdales eighth episode in March 2017, as well as the background music for the 2018 Ford Mustang GT commercial, with Helen Hunt and Evan Rachel Wood.

A music video directed by Taylor Cohen was released on June 1, 2015.

Charts and certifications

Weekly charts

Year-end charts

Certifications

Other notable covers
 Dusty Springfield released an early cover on her 1964 album A Girl Called Dusty.
 The Ormsby Brothers released the first male version of this song in 1973. The New Zealand group's version peaked at number 5 in Australia in that year.
 André Hazes recorded a Dutch-language version of the song in 1981 for his album Gewoon André; "Zeg Maar Niets Meer" was popular in Europe, and reached number 2 in the Dutch charts in early 1982.
 The song was featured in the 1996 film The First Wives Club as sung by Diane Keaton, Bette Midler and Goldie Hawn. It also attracted fan following.
 Kristin Chenoweth recorded a cover of this song alongside Ariana Grande, for her 2019 album For the Girls.
The 2022 Netflix series Stay Close used "You Don't Own Me" as the theme song, sung by Nikki Williams.
The Blow Monkeys covered the song for the soundtrack to the 1987 film Dirty Dancing. 
Lani Misalucha recorded a cover for the soundtrack in 2015 Star Cinema movie "Etiquette for the Mistresses".

See also 
 List of feminist anthems
 My body, my choice

References

1960s ballads
1963 singles
1963 songs
1964 singles
1981 singles
André Hazes songs
Bette Midler songs
Lesley Gore songs
Mercury Records singles
2015 debut singles
G-Eazy songs
RCA Records singles
Song recordings produced by Quincy Jones
Songs with feminist themes
Songs written by David White (musician)
Songs written by John Medora